Abdirahman Ahmed (died 15 January 2009) was a Somali politician. He was executed by an Islamist militia for alleged apostasy. He was tried and convicted by a Sharia court, but was not allowed legal representation according to his family.

References

2009 deaths
Somalian politicians
Year of birth missing
Executed politicians
Executed Somalian people
21st-century executions by Somalia
People executed for apostasy from Islam